Christian Rodska (born Christian Rodskjaer; 5 September 1945) is an English actor who has appeared in many television and radio series and narrated a number of audiobooks, including Sir Winston Churchill's Nobel Prize winning The Second World War. He is perhaps best known for his regular role as Ron Stryker in 1970s series, Follyfoot.

Career 

Rodska began acting professionally in the late 1960s and got his first big break when he was chosen to appear in Follyfoot, which ran for three years from 1971 to 1973. From then on, he appeared in numerous series such as the 1977 BBC adaptation of Rosemary Sutcliff's The Eagle of the Ninth, in which he played Esca, and the film version of The Likely Lads, Z Cars, The Tomorrow People, Coronation Street,  Brookside, Bergerac and Casualty. More recently, he has worked extensively as a voice artist, featuring in many radio plays and on Audiobooks. He is known for his narration of Ice Road Truckers on the Discovery Channel, as well as MegaStructures for British channel, Five. In 2004, Rodska guest-starred in the Doctor Who audio drama Faith Stealer. He continues to act on television, recently appearing on Doc Martin and as DI Dennis Carter in the BBC's 55 Degrees North, and in the 2008 drama Margaret Thatcher - The Long Walk to Finchley. He has also been the narrator for the series The Future Is Wild.

Personal life 

Rodska was born in Cullercoats, Northumberland. He is the son of a Danish sailor, who was at one time, the Captain of the Royal Yacht of King Faisal of Iraq. Rodska was married to a French woman, Jacqueline Mousny, while in Follyfoot and they had a son, Benjamin, who played the lead role in the 1985 television adaptation of Oliver Twist in which his father also appeared. and a daughter, Camille. He is now married to Barbara Kellermann.

References

External links

The Follyfoot Fan Tribute Site
Follyfoot forum

1945 births
Audiobook narrators
English people of Danish descent
English male television actors
Living people
People from Cullercoats
Male actors from Tyne and Wear
Actors from Northumberland
Actors from County Durham